In judo,  is a hand throwing technique (te-waza) that counters an uchi mata attack. The tori steps aside so the uchi mata misses, then throws the uke forward. The Kodokan adopted uchi mata sukashi as one of several shinmeisho no waza ("newly accepted techniques").

See also
List of judo techniques
List of Kodokan judo techniques

References

External links
Video of uchi mata sukashi and other techniques recorded at the World Judo Championships in Munich, 2001. 
Uchi-mata-sukashi Kodokan demonstration video in youtube.

Judo technique
Throw (grappling)